The Battle of Öland can refer to several naval battles fought around the Baltic island of Öland:

 Battle of Öland (1563) during the Northern Seven Years' War (1563-1570)
 Battle of Öland during the Scanian War fought in 1676
 Battle of Öland (1789) during the Russo-Swedish War (1788-1790)